The canton of Rambouillet is an administrative division of the Yvelines department, northern France. Its borders were modified at the French canton reorganisation which came into effect in March 2015. Its seat is in Rambouillet.

It consists of the following communes:
 
Ablis
Allainville
Auffargis
Boinville-le-Gaillard
La Boissière-École
Bonnelles
Les Bréviaires
Bullion
La Celle-les-Bordes
Cernay-la-Ville
Clairefontaine-en-Yvelines
Émancé
Les Essarts-le-Roi
Gambaiseuil
Gazeran
Hermeray
Longvilliers
Mittainville
Orcemont
Orphin
Orsonville
Paray-Douaville
Le Perray-en-Yvelines
Poigny-la-Forêt
Ponthévrard
Prunay-en-Yvelines
Raizeux
Rambouillet
Rochefort-en-Yvelines
Saint-Arnoult-en-Yvelines
Sainte-Mesme
Saint-Hilarion
Saint-Léger-en-Yvelines
Saint-Martin-de-Bréthencourt
Sonchamp
Vieille-Église-en-Yvelines

References

Cantons of Yvelines